Mombar (in ِArabic: ممبار) or sheep fawaregh (in ِArabic: فوارغ) is a kind of Arab sausage dish especially popular in Egypt. Syria, Algeria, Tunisia, and Libya. It is made from sheep casing stuffed with a rice and meat mixture and deep fried.

Ingredients
The main ingredients in mombar are beef sausage meat, rice, tomatoes, onion, garlic, coriander, oil, and spices.

Naming
The equivalent of Egyptian mombar in Syria is qubawat; and palsin in Lebanon and Palestine is known as fawaregh, also known in Libya as usban.

Meat sausages (typically without rice) in North African cuisine are merguez.

Variants
Several varieties of usban exist, and the herbs and spices used can vary but typically include cayenne pepper, black pepper, turmeric and cinnamon, as well as dried mint, parsley and dill. This is added to spring onion, tomato, vegetable oil and rice. The mixture is stuffed into sheep intestines or commercial sausage casings and then tied off with thread at the ends. The sausages cook in a pot for an hour and are then browned in a frying pan or oven.

See also
 Egyptian cuisine
 List of stuffed dishes

References

External links
 Egyptian food from cooks.com

Egyptian cuisine
Arab cuisine
African cuisine
Mediterranean cuisine